The New Zealand Chess Championship was first conducted in 1879.

Note:  Up until 1934 foreign players were eligible for the title. The eligibility rules were changed in 1935 to preclude this; John Angus Erskine (twice champion in 1929 and 1935) was born in Invercargill and was therefore eligible although he was domiciled in Melbourne, Australia.

The event is organised by the New Zealand Chess Federation.

New Zealand Champions and Premier Reserve / New Zealand Major Open Champions

Championship Multiple Winners

The New Zealand Rapid Chess Championship was first conducted in 1993.

The event is organised by the New Zealand Chess Federation.

New Zealand Rapid Champions

Rapid Championship Multiple Winners

Championship Double Winners

The New Zealand Women's Championship is played for the Mabel Abbott Trophy.

Women's Championship Winners

North Island Champions
The North Island Chess Championship was first conducted in 1954. Players compete for the Charles Belton Trophy. The event is organised by the New Zealand Chess Federation.

North Island Championship Multiple Winners

South Island Champions
The South Island Chess Championship was first conducted in 1950. The event is organised by the New Zealand Chess Federation.

South Island Championship Multiple Winners

New Zealand Correspondence Champions
Winners of the New Zealand correspondence chess Championship (start year given):

1933	R.O. Scott
1934	---
1935	E.F. Tibbetts
1936	J.T. Burton
1937	S. Hindin
1938	S. Hindin
1939	S. Hindin 
1940	G.C. Cole
1941	J.A. Cunningham
1942	G.C. Cole
1943	G.C. Cole
1944	F.H. Grant, T. Lepviikman, N.M. Cromarty
1945	C.J. Taylor
1946	R.W. Lungley
1947	D.I. Lynch
1948	D.I. Lynch
1949	N.M. Cromarty
1950	N.M. Cromarty
1951	H.G. King, J.A. Cunningham
1952	H.P. Whitlock
1953	R.W. Park
1954	J.A. Cunningham
1955	E.J. Byrne
1956	A.E. Turner
1957	D.I. Lynch
1958	R.A. Court, L. Esterman
1959	R.A. Court, J. Eriksen, J.A. Cunningham
1960	J.A. Cunningham
1961	F.A. Foulds
1962	R.A. Court
1963	J. Eriksen
1964	F.A. Foulds
1965	Ortvin Sarapu
1966	R.S. Wilkin, R.A. Court
1967	J.H. Patchett
1968	Ortvin Sarapu
1969	Ortvin Sarapu
1970	Richard John Sutton
1971	Paul Anthony Garbett
1972	K.W. Lynn
1973	D.A. Flude
1974	T. van Dijk
1975	L.J. Jones
1976	P.A. Clemance
1977	L.J. Jones
1978	R.W. Smith
1979	M.R. Freeman
1980	R. Chapman
1981	R. Chapman
1982	Paul Anthony Garbett, T. van Dijk
1983(50)M.R. Freeman
1984	M.R. Heasman
1985	P. van Dijk
1986	G.M. Turner
1987	P. van Dijk
1988	H.P. Bennett, M.F.Noble (IM)
1989	H.P. Whitlock
1990	P.W. Stuart
1991	R.J. Dive, P.W. Stuart
1992	M.G. Hampl
1993(60)R.J. Dive
1994	G.B. Banks
1995	M.G. Hampl
1996	B.F. Barnard
1997	B.F. Barnard
1998	B.F. Barnard
1999	T.J. Doyle
2000    A.J. Short
2001    M.L. Dunwoody
2002    M.L. Dunwoody
2003(70)P.B. Goffin
2004    R.E. Gibbons
2005    R.E. Gibbons, M.F. Noble (SIM)
2006    H.P. Bennett
2007    H.P. Bennett, M.F. Noble (SIM)
2008    M.F. Noble (SIM)
2009    M.F. Noble (SIM)
2010    M.F. Noble (GM)
2011    M.F. Noble (GM), P.B. Goffin
2012    M.F. Noble (GM)
2013(80)M.F. Noble (GM)
2014    M.F. Noble (GM), Mathew King, Malia Donnelly/King, John Eide
2015    M.F. Noble (GM)
2016    M.F. Noble (GM)
2017    M.F. Noble (GM)
2018    M.T. Sims
2019    M.D. McNabb
2020    M.D. McNabb
2021    M.F. Noble (GM), M.D. McNabb, M.T. Sims, R.E. Gibbons

M.F. Noble (GM) 14 Titles
J.A. Cunningham & R.A. Court  4 Titles
G.C. Cole , S.Hindin , O.Sarapu , D.I. Lynch , B.F. Barnard & H.P. Bennett, M D McNabb, R E Gibbons       3 Titles

New Zealand Veterans Champions
Winners of the New Zealand Veterans Championship (start year given):

2014    R. E. Gibbons, A. Booth, N. Cooper
2015    R. E. Gibbons, N. Cooper
2016    G. Kerr
2017    W. Lynn
2018    G. Kerr
2019    P. Garbett
2020    R. E. Gibbons
2021    Covid Lockdown

References
List of titles at NZCF website
 (winners list through 1975/6)
 (Winners through 1984)

External links
Official NZCF Website
NZ Chess History Website

Chess national championships
Championship
1879 in chess
1879 establishments in New Zealand
Recurring events established in 1879
Chess